An Aircraft Incident Management Procedure (Dutch: Vliegtuigongevalscenario or VOS) is a Dutch standard Incident Management Procedure for incidents at or near airports involving one or more aircraft. This is the aviation specific Coordinated Regional Incident Management Procedure or CRIMP (Dutch: Gecoördineerde Regionale Incidentbestrijdings Procedure) or GRIP. A VOS arranges the amount of emergency services and support by air-side and/or land-side operations of the airport. There are some small differences in naming the VOS at the respective airports in the Netherlands, but the incident management is generally the same.

Schiphol
At Amsterdam Airport Schiphol there are seven stages of aircraft incident management: VOS 1 to VOS 7. In this case VOS means Vliegtuig Ongeval Schiphol (Schiphol Aircraft Incident Procedure). The number designates the complexity of the alarm generated by the aircraft captain or first officer. The GRIP number gives the corresponding CRIMP level by the national emergency services (police, fire and rescue and ambulance services) 

Emergency management in the Netherlands
Incident management